= Alaska Timbers =

- Founded: 2020; 6 years ago
- Stadium: ConocoPhillips Stadium; Anchorage, Alaska, United States
- Capacity: 2,000
- Coordinates: 61°13′N 149°54′W
- General Manager: Danny Reynolds
- Head Coach: Jeremy Johnson
- League: UPSL
- 2020: 1st, Last Frontier Division
- Website: https://www.facebook.com/upslalaskatimbers

Alaska Timbers is a semi-professional soccer club based in Anchorage, Alaska. The club's senior team began playing in the Last Frontier Division of the United Premier Soccer League in 2020. The team is an official affiliate of the Portland Timbers of Major League Soccer and the Portland Thorns of the NWSL.

== History ==
An official youth affiliation between the Portland Timbers and the Anchorage Youth Soccer Club was announced in November 2019. AYSC became one of ten affiliate clubs across Oregon, Idaho, and Washington. The agreement was the first of its kind between a professional soccer club and an Alaskan team. On April 30, 2020 it was announced that the club would field a pro-development team in the United Premier Soccer League, the fifth tier of the United States soccer league system, beginning with the 2020 season.

The team played its first league match on June 21, 2020 against Arctic Rush. It earned a 4–1 victory with Timbers player Cole Fox scoring the opening goal of the entire 2020 UPSL season and the first in Alaska Timbers history. The team finished its first season undefeated with a 5–1–0 record and won the Last Frontier Division title.

== Current roster ==
No.	Position	Player	Nation

== Record ==
Key

Champion Runners-up 3rd Place

Year	Division	League	Pld.	W	L	D	GF	GA	+/-	Regular Season	Other
2020	5	UPSL	6	5	0	1	30	8	22	1st, Last Frontier Division	
2021	5	UPSL	8	0	1	7	8	26	−18	5th	

== Club management ==
As of June 23, 2020

Position	Staff
Technical Director	Jo Reid
General Manager	Danny Reynolds
Head Coach	Jeremy Johnson
Assistant Coach	Will Lucero
